Mannuzzu is a surname. Notable people with the surname include: 

 Lidia Mannuzzu (1958–2016), Italian biologist, physiologist and academic
 Salvatore Mannuzzu (1930–2019), Italian writer, politician, and magistrate

Italian-language surnames